Pedro Serrano (9 November 1931 – 10 November 2017) was a Puerto Rican weightlifter. He competed at the 1964 Summer Olympics and the 1968 Summer Olympics.

References

1931 births
2017 deaths
Puerto Rican male weightlifters
Olympic weightlifters of Puerto Rico
Weightlifters at the 1964 Summer Olympics
Weightlifters at the 1968 Summer Olympics
People from Aguas Buenas, Puerto Rico
Pan American Games medalists in weightlifting
Pan American Games silver medalists for Puerto Rico
Weightlifters at the 1963 Pan American Games
20th-century Puerto Rican people
21st-century Puerto Rican people